Recess Therapy is a web series, Instagram, and TikTok account run by Doing Things Media in which host and creator Julian Shapiro-Barnum interviews children between the ages of 2 and 9 in New York City. The interviews have been shared on YouTube and Instagram since 2021.

Background 
Julian Shapiro-Barnum grew up in three households in Brooklyn, raised by five gay parents: two fathers and three mothers. His parents jokingly called him the "Mayor of Everywhere" in reference to his outgoing nature and desire to talk to people. He began taking an improv class in third grade, beginning a string of formal acting activity that would continue through his graduation from Boston University in 2021 with a BFA in acting.

After a 2020 study abroad program in Madrid was cut short due to the COVID-19 pandemic, Shapiro-Barnum returned to Brooklyn where he became involved in the Black Lives Matter protests in New York City. He filmed a scripted talk show called The Social Distance with his fathers through The Tank, followed by an unscripted show titled How Are You Doing Right Now? in which he interviewed strangers on the sidewalk, and a similar show called I'm Interested in which he played truth or dare with strangers.

In 2021, while editing dog videos for online production company Doing Things Media, Shapiro-Barnum decided to begin a project focused on children's ability to remain positive during the pandemic. He successfully pitched the idea to Doing Things, and the media company provided him with a producer, editor, and platform for what would become Recess Therapy. The project initially was part of his senior project at Boston University.

Format 
Recess Therapy is a web series and Instagram account. Shapiro-Barnum interviews children in New York City between the ages of 2 and 9 for the series. Interview topics vary and have included climate change, the economy, and peeing your pants. He was inspired how “kids in the playground remained joyous despite the pandemic’s perturbations.” In an interview with The New York Times, Shapiro-Barnum said, “The reason it’s called Recess Therapy is that the original idea was that I was going to bring things that I was struggling with to children and, like, get advice from them.”

Platforms 
Recess Therapy interviews are published as short video clips on Instagram and TikTok, while full episodes are shared on YouTube.

Production 
A production shoot for Recess Therapy usually lasts about four and a half hours and yields 15 interviews. Filming is done by Julia Ty Goldberg and Charlotte Weinman, who were two college classmates of Shapiro-Barnum.

Reception 
At the start of 2022, the series was featured on Today as a "Fave Follow". In February 2022, a segment on ABC News described it as a "popular digital series warming the hearts of millions". 

In an interview with the New York Times in April, Shapiro-Barnum said that an episode focused on LGBT pride led the show to lose 60,000 followers.

In August 2022, a video that shows a boy describing corn as "a big lump with knobs" was remixed by The Gregory Brothers called "It's Corn." It quickly gained attention on TikTok later that month.

Recess Therapy surpassed 2.4 million followers on social media in September 2022.

See also 

 Kids Say the Darndest Things
 Kids React

References

External links 

 
 

American web series
Instagram accounts
YouTube channels launched in 2021